Senate elections were held in South Vietnam on 2 September 1967. The election was contested by a total of 48 lists, of which six would be elected (each voter had six votes) and receive 10 seats each. Voter turnout was reported to be 83.8%..

Results

References

South Vietnam
Elections in South Vietnam
Senate election
Election and referendum articles with incomplete results